Debate has occurred throughout Asia over proposals to legalize same-sex marriage as well as civil unions.

Following a Constitutional Court ruling and a subsequent legislative act, Taiwan became the first country in Asia to legalize same-sex marriage nationwide on 24 May 2019. In addition, Israel recognises same-sex marriages validly performed abroad, and same-sex marriages are legal in the UK sovereign base areas of Akrotiri and Dhekelia and the British Indian Ocean Territory.

Israel recognises unregistered cohabitation for same-sex couples. Several cities in Cambodia provide same-sex couples with some limited rights and benefits, including hospital visitation rights. Some cities in Japan issue certificates for same-sex couples, however they are entirely symbolic. In Hong Kong, the same-sex partners of residents can receive spousal visas and spousal benefits.

Current situation

National level

Sub-national level

Partially-recognized and unrecognized states

Future legislation

Marriage

Opposition proposals or proposals without a parliamentary majority 

 India: India does not have a codified civil marriage code. A draft of a Uniform Civil Code that would legalise same-sex marriage was proposed in 2017. There are also several same-sex marriage petitions pending in the courts. An opposition NCP MP introduced a bill to legalize same-sex marriages under the Special Marriages Act on 1 April 2022.

 
Japan: A bill presented by the Constitutional Democratic Party of Japan

Non-marital partnership

Opposition proposals or proposals without a parliamentary majority 

 Philippines: In 2022, two same-sex civil union bills have been proposed to the Philippine Congress. The first bill, named the "Civil Partnership Act", was proposed by Bagong Henerasyon party-list representative Bernadette Herrera-Dy in July 2022. This bill would provide recognition of same-sex couples in the Philippines and grant them the same benefits and protections as opposite-sex married couples on a national level. This bill was also proposed in previous Congresses, but did not pass. In August 2022, Muslim senator Robin Padilla proposed a similar bill named the "Civil Unions Act", which would provide benefits and protections for same-sex couples similar to Herrera-Dy's, as well as inheritance rights, adoption rights, and other privileges granted to married couples.

Public opinion

In 2019, a survey by The Economist found that 45% of respondents in the Asia-Pacific region believed same-sex marriage is inevitable in the region, with 31% of respondents disagreeing. Also, three-quarters of those surveyed reported a more open climate for LGBT rights compared to three years ago. Of those reporting an improving climate for LGBT people, 38% cited a change in policies or laws, while 36% said coverage of LGBT issues in mainstream media was a major factor. The top reason cited for diminishing openness was anti-LGBT advocacy by religious institutions.

See also 
 LGBT rights in Asia
 Recognition of same-sex unions in Africa
 Recognition of same-sex unions in the Americas
 Recognition of same-sex unions in Europe
 Recognition of same-sex unions in Oceania

Notes

References